Persatuan Sepakbola Kupang (simply known as PSK Kupang) is an Indonesian football club based in Kupang Regency, East Nusa Tenggara. They currently compete in the Liga 3 and their homeground is Oepoi Stadium.

Players

Former players
Here are the former PSK Kupang players;
 Frans Watu
 Lourens Fernandez
 Yopie Riwu
 Agustinus Maufa
 Nelson Noakh
 Rudolf Rudi Rodja
 Thomas Ola Langodae

References

External links

Kupang Regency
Football clubs in Indonesia
Football clubs in East Nusa Tenggara